Ali Oidak or Alioitak is a populated place located in the Gu Achi District of the Papago Indian Reservation in Pima County, Arizona, United States. The place name means "little field" in the O'odham or Papago language. A 1969 study of Papago communities lists it as a village with a single field well, supporting six houses.

References

Unincorporated communities in Pima County, Arizona
Unincorporated communities in Arizona
Tohono O'odham Nation